The Flying Luttenbachers is an American instrumental unit led by multi-instrumentalist/composer/improviser/producer Weasel Walter. The Flying Luttenbachers have created a body of work focused on musical extremity and dissonance. Over the course of the band, the personnel has shifted numerous times around the artistic leadership of Walter. The music ranges from intense all-acoustic free improvisation, to complex and modernistic rock composition; electronic noise to punk-inspired jazz. Walter has been quoted as drawing inspiration from the fields of punk, death metal, free jazz, and no wave.

Walter moved to the San Francisco Bay Area in 2003, where he reformed The Flying Luttenbachers with the addition of bassist Mike Green, guitarist Ed Rodrigues and later Mick Barr. The Flying Luttenbachers officially disbanded in 2007.

In 2017, after a ten-year hiatus, an incarnation of The Flying Luttenbachers with Walter on drums, joined by guitarist Chris Welcome and bassist Tim Dahl, played several shows in France. In 2019, a quartet arrangement of the band released Shattered Dimension, with Walter, on drums, joined by saxophonist Matt Nelson, and bassist Tim Dahl. Over the next several years, the varying lineup also included bassist Evan Lipson, guitarist Brandon Seabrook, guitarist Henry Kaiser, guitarist Wendy Eisenberg, guitarist Katie Battistoni, guitarist Alex Ward, and drummer Sam Ospovat.

History
The Flying Luttenbachers formed in December 1991 in Chicago, Illinois as a punk jazz trio, with Hal Russell (tenor and soprano saxes, trumpet, vibraphone, drums, co founder), Chad Organ (tenor sax, moog synthesizer, baritone sax) and Weasel Walter (drums, guitar, bass, keyboards, woodwinds, electronics, main composer). The band derived their moniker from Russell's birthname, Harold Luttenbacher. Russell left the band in June 1992, and was soon replaced by Ken Vandermark for the recording of The Flying Luttenbachers' first 7″ record.

The band has since featured a frequently shifting cast of free jazz and experimental rock musicians, including Fred Lonberg-Holm, Kurt Johnson, Jeb Bishop, Alex Perkolup, Mick Barr, Ed Rodriguez, Mike Green and Jonathan Hischke. The Flying Luttenbachers have toured Europe and the US extensively with bands like The Locust, Arab On Radar, Lightning Bolt, U.S. Maple, Erase Errata, Bobby Conn, and Wolf Eyes. Walter moved from Chicago to Oakland, California in 2003, beginning yet another incarnation of the group. The live band played their final concert in November 2006. The Flying Luttenbachers project officially ceased operation in November 2007 upon the release of a final studio album (recorded solo by Walter).

In 2017 the band reformed for a tour in France invited by the Sonic Protest festival. The newest incarnation of the group appeared opening three shows for Oh Sees at Warsaw in Brooklyn, NY on October 17–19.

Conceptual continuity
Since 1996’s Revenge album, the Flying Luttenbachers’ musical output has been underlined by a gradually unravelling storyline concerning the self-obliteration of the planet Earth and the resulting aftermath. The 2006 album Cataclysm concerns an interstellar battle between two monolithic entities: The Void (a dark, silent spectre detailed on 2004’s album of the same name) and The Iridescent Behemoth (a massive planetoid being whose tale was told on 2003’s complex Systems Emerge From Complete Disorder album). The music energetically utilizes deliberate harmonic dissonance and the material operates on a principle of intelligent transformation of concise amounts of interrelated themes.

Discography

Singles
 "546 Seconds Of Noise" 7″ (Quinnah/ugEXPLODE, 1992, Quinnah 01/ug003)
 "1389 Seconds Of Noise" 7″ (Quinnah/ugEXPLODE, 1993, Quinnah 02/ug004)

Albums
 Destructo Noise Explosion!: Live at WNUR 2-6-92 cassette/LP/CD (ugEXPLODE/Coat-tail, 1992)
 Constructive Destruction LP/CD (ugEXPLODE/Quinnah, 1994)
 Destroy All Music LP/CD (Chimp/ugEXPLODE/Skin Graft, 1995)
 Revenge LP/CD (ugEXPLODE/Skin Graft, 1996)
 Live in the Middle East cassette (Bourgeois/Elevated Chimp, 1996)
 Gods of Chaos CD (ugEXPLODE/Skin Graft, 1998)
 Retrospektiw III CD (ugEXPLODE/Quinnah, 1998)
 "...The Truth Is a Fucking Lie..." LP/CD (ugEXPLODE/Skin Graft, 1999)
 Alptraum CD (ugEXPLODE/Pandemonium, 2000)
 Trauma 2XLP (ugEXPLODE, 2001)
 Infection and Decline LP/CD (ugEXPLODE/Troubleman Unlimited, 2002)
 Retrospektiw IV CD (ugEXPLODE/MNTCIA, 2002)
 Systems Emerge from Complete Disorder LP/CD (ugEXPLODE/Troubleman Unlimited, 2003)
 The Void LP/CD (ugEXPLODE/Troubleman Unlimited, 2004)
 Spectral Warrior Mythos Volume 1 CD (ugEXPLODE, 2005)
 Cataclysm CD (ugEXPLODE, 2006)
 Incarceration by Abstraction CD (ugEXPLODE, 2007)
 Shattered Dimension CD (ugEXPLODE, 2019)
 Imminent Death CD (ugEXPLODE, 2019)
 Negative Infinity CD (ugEXPLODE, 2021)
 Terror Iridescence CD (unEXPLODE, 2022)

Compilations
 Camp Skingraft 33 Hits! Now Wave Volumes 1-3 CD (Skin Graft Records, 1997, GR50)
 Hayfever EP No. 4 7″ (Hayfever Magazine, 1997, No. 4)
 Knormalities 7″ (Dephine Knormal Musik, 1998, DKM 03)
 Troubleman Mix-Tape 2xCD (Troubleman Unlimited, 2001, TMU-050)
 Troubleman 2003 Sampler CD (Troubleman Unlimited, 2003, TMU-109)

References

External links
 Official Website

American instrumental musical groups
American artist groups and collectives
American noise rock music groups
Musical groups from Chicago